Loppijärvi is a medium-sized lake in Finland. It is situated in the municipality of Loppi in the Tavastia Proper region. The lake is part of Kokemäki River basin and it drains through Tervajoki River into Lake Kernaalanjärvi which in its turn drains into Lake Vanajavesi through Hiidenjoki River. On the north shore of the lake is Kirkonkylä, the administrative center of the Loppi, and on the south shore the village of Läyliäinen.

See also
List of lakes in Finland

References

Kokemäenjoki basin
Landforms of Kanta-Häme
Lakes of Loppi